Carolyn Tillotson (born May 3, 1938) is an American former politician who served in the Kansas State Senate for one term from 1993 to 1996.

References

1938 births
Living people
Republican Party Kansas state senators
Women state legislators in Kansas
Politicians from Leavenworth, Kansas
20th-century American politicians
20th-century American women politicians
Politicians from Little Rock, Arkansas